"Spur of the Moment" is episode 141 of the American television anthology series The Twilight Zone. In this episode, a young woman is set upon by a mysterious and terrifying woman dressed in black just hours before her marriage. Alternating between scenes set 25 years apart, the episode explores themes of regret and the danger of yielding to passion.

Opening narration

Plot
On June 13, 1939, 18-year-old Anne Henderson rides a horse across her family's property. Upon a ridge, a fierce woman dressed all in black on a stallion screams at her, incomprehensibly. Anne, petrified, races toward her home with the strange woman in fast pursuit before breaking off the chase. When Anne arrives home, her parents and her investment banker fiancé, Robert, are waiting for her there. She tells them of her frightful experience and that she believes the woman wanted to kill her. Her parents and Robert, a respectable investment broker, calm her down and talk of the upcoming marriage. However, Anne is plainly uncomfortable with Robert, who is stiff and makes insensitive jokes.

Her former fiancé, David Mitchell, whom she has known since childhood, appears at the door. Arrogantly forcing his way inside past an elderly retainer, David pleads with Anne to call off her wedding and be with him. David and Robert have words, and David knocks Robert down but does not cause any serious harm. Anne can't bring herself to answer David's question or to look him in the eye as he challenges her to do. Anne's father tells David to consider her silence the answer and then forces him to leave the house at gunpoint.

Twenty-five years later, Anne is a miserable alcoholic. She tells her mother her recollection of what happened upon the ridge, pointing out that there is a saying, "Go chase yourself," and she realizes she has been doing just that. Her mother, having received another phone call from an otherwise unidentified lawyer, is devastated about losing the estate in a pending dispossession and seems uninterested in her daughter's metaphysical time-traveling marvel. Anne disparages her now deceased father for spoiling her and not allowing her to earn anything or learn such things as judgment and discrimination. Her mother slaps her for "debasing" her father's memory, and Anne slaps her back, declaring her mother's comments to be "cornball." Anne asks her mother if she remembers that night, 25 years earlier, when she came home terrified after riding her horse. Anne now realizes she was pursuing her younger self on horseback, trying to warn herself not to marry the wrong man. She notes that her dissolute and abusive husband has bankrupted the estate through mismanagement. However, her husband is not Robert but the arrogant, pushy, mercurial David. During her engagement party 25 years ago, Anne ran away and eloped with David.

The older Anne leaves the house for another ride on horseback. She again approaches the ridge line and sees her younger self down below. She pursues the young Anne with her warning, and her words are now audible: "Anne... stop!" but the younger Anne still cannot hear her, and the older Anne is still unable to catch her.

Closing narration

References
DeVoe, Bill. (2008). Trivia from The Twilight Zone. Albany, GA: Bear Manor Media. 
Grams, Martin. (2008). The Twilight Zone: Unlocking the Door to a Television Classic. Churchville, MD: OTR Publishing.

External links

1964 American television episodes
The Twilight Zone (1959 TV series season 5) episodes
Television episodes about time travel
Television episodes written by Richard Matheson
Fiction set in 1939
Fiction set in 1964